New York Avenue may refer to:

Places
 New York Avenue (Washington, D.C.)
 NoMa–Gallaudet U station, formerly known as New York Ave-Florida Ave
 New York Avenue (LIRR station) or Union Hall Street, a station on the Long Island Rail Road's Main Line at Union Hall Street at York College in Jamaica, Queens, New York City
 New York Avenue, an avenue in Brooklyn, New York City to which the Nostrand Avenue Line runs parallel
 New York Avenue, an avenue in western Suffolk County, New York, much of which is part of New York State Route 110
 East New York Avenue, a continuation of Jamaica Avenue in the East New York neighborhood of Brooklyn, New York City

Games
 New York Avenue, an orange-shaded property in many U.S. Monopoly game versions

See also
 Streets of New York (disambiguation)